The Pennsylvania Rebellion were a National Pro Fastpitch softball team based in Washington, Pennsylvania. They were added as an expansion team for the 2014 season, receiving the roster and draft position of the recently defunct NY/NJ Comets. They folded after the 2016 season.

Franchise history

2014
The Rebellion joined NPF for the 2014 season, and received both the NY/NJ Comets' roster and draft position. This resulted in Pennsylvania having the overall first pick in the 2014 NPF draft, which they used for Arizona State's pitcher Dallas Escobedo, who pitched for the Rebellion's first ever win.

Overall, the Rebellion struggled through the season, batting a league-worst .199.  Manager Rick Bertagnolli resigned following a 2–10 start, citing 'personal reasons.'  Assistant coach Stacey Rice, was named to replace him.
The Rebellion's inaugural season ended with 9–39 record, finishing in last place.

2015
On January 14, the Rebellion announced that the head coach of the Netherlands women's national softball team, Craig Montvidas, was hired as the Rebellion's coach.  On January 26, Steve Zavacky was promoted to general manager.
The team missed the playoffs, finishing in last place.

2016
The team missed the playoffs, finishing in last place.

On January 16, 2017, the NPF announced that the ownership of the Pennsylvania Rebellion would be dissolving the team, effective immediately.  All Rebellion players under contract were granted free agency.

General managers
 Francine Williams (2014)
 Steve Zavacky (2015-2016)

All-time head coaches

17-33

Season-by-season 

|-
|align=center|2014 || 9 || 39 || 0 || 4th place National Pro Fastpitch || Lost in NPF Semifinals 
|-
|align=center|2015 || 16 || 32 || 0 || 5th place National Pro Fastpitch || Did Not Qualify
|-
|align=center|2016 || 17 || 33 || 0 || 6th place National Pro Fastpitch || Did Not Qualify
|-
!Totals || 42|| 104 || 0
|colspan="2"|

Final roster
Below is the final Rebellion roster after they made their final trade in January 2017.  All players shown were granted free agency when the team was dissolved.

References

External links 
 
 Pennsylvania Rebellion Home Page

Softball teams
Pennsylvania Rebellion
National Pro Fastpitch teams
Sports clubs established in 2013
Sports clubs disestablished in 2017
2013 establishments in Pennsylvania
2017 disestablishments in Pennsylvania
Washington, Pennsylvania